is a railway station in the city of Hanamaki, Iwate, Japan, operated by East Japan Railway Company (JR East).

Lines
Tsuchizawa Station is served by the Kamaishi Line, and is located 15.9 rail kilometers from the terminus of the line at Hanamaki Station.

Station layout
The station has two opposed ground-level side platforms connected to the station building by a level crossing.  The station is unattended.

Platforms

History
The line was nationalized in 1936, becoming the Kamaishi Line. The station was absorbed into the JR East network upon the privatization of the Japanese National Railways (JNR) on 1 April 1987.

Passenger statistics
In fiscal 2017, the station was used by an average of 168 passengers daily (boarding passengers only).

Surrounding area
 Tetsugoro Yorozu Memorial Museum
 Tōwa Post Office

See also
 List of railway stations in Japan

References

External links

 

Railway stations in Iwate Prefecture
Kamaishi Line
Railway stations in Japan opened in 1913
Hanamaki, Iwate
Stations of East Japan Railway Company